Maurice Piat CSSp GCSK (born 19 July 1941) is a Mauritian Roman Catholic prelate who has served as Bishop of Port Louis, Mauritius, since 1993; he is also a professed member of the Congregation of the Holy Spirit. Piat was ordained a priest in 1970 and made a bishop in 1991. Pope Francis made him a cardinal on 19 November 2016.

Life
Maurice Piat was born in 1941 in Moka, Mauritius. He attended the Collège du Saint-Esprit, a middle and high school in Quatre Bornes. Upon graduating, he entered the novitiate of the Congregation of the Holy Spirit in Co. Tipperary, Ireland, where he made his solemn profession on 8 September 1962. While training at the Holy Ghost College, Kimmage Manor he obtained a bachelor's degree from University College Dublin. He studied for the priesthood in Rome, while residing at the Pontifical French Seminary. He was ordained a priest in Rome on 2 August 1970. He earned a licentiate in theology from the Pontifical Gregorian University in 1972. That same year he spent three months of pastoral ministry in Bangalore, India.

He returned to Mauritius and worked as a catechist and professor at his old college until 1982, when he was made responsible for seminarians at the Foyer Mgr Murphy in Vacoas. He returned to his homeland to serve as vicar of the parish of Saint-François-d'Assise in Pamplemousses from 1979 to 1985. He became the pastor of the parish of Coeur-Immaculé-de-Marie in Riviere-du-Rempart in 1986. From 1981 he was in charge of diocesan pastoral planning.

On 21 January 1991, Pope John Paul II named him the Coadjutor Bishop of the Roman Catholic Diocese of Port-Louis. He received his episcopal consecration on 19 May 1991 from Cardinal Jean Margéot. He chose as his motto "Pousse vers le large" ("Set out into the deep"), a saying of Christ in Luke's Gospel, when he orders Peter the fisherman to cast his net again after a day of unfruitful work . On 15 March 1993 he was appointed the eleventh Bishop of Port Louis and was installed that same year. Piat served as the President of the Episcopal Conference of the Indian Ocean from 1996 to 2002.

In March 2009 the government of Mauritius made him a Grand Officer of the Order of the Star and Key of the Indian Ocean.

In 2015, Piat participated in the Synod on the Family.

He submitted his resignation as bishop on his 75th birthday as required by canon law. Pope Francis announced on 9 October 2016 that he would raise Piat to the rank of cardinal in a consistory on 19 November 2016. When created a cardinal on that date, he was made a Cardinal-Priest and assigned the titular church of Santa Teresa al Corso d'Italia. Mauritius has had only one cardinal before, Piat's immediate predecessor, Jean Margéot.

On 12 March 2017 the government of Mauritius awarded him its highest honour by making him a Grand Commander of Order of the Star and Key of the Indian Ocean (GCSK).

Pope Francis appointed him to the Dicastery for Promoting Integral Human Development on 23 December 2017.

References

External links

 
Diocese of Port Louis: Biography (in French)
Le Mauricien: articles about Maurice Piat
Catholic Hierarchy

1941 births
Living people
20th-century Roman Catholic bishops in Mauritius
Roman Catholic bishops of Port-Louis
21st-century Roman Catholic bishops in Mauritius
People from Moka District
Pontifical Gregorian University alumni
Alumni of University College Dublin
Cardinals created by Pope Francis
Mauritian cardinals
Holy Ghost Fathers